Soto del Barco (Asturian: Sotu'l Barcu) is a small, coastal municipality in the Autonomous Community of the Principality of Asturias, Spain. It is located on the banks of the mouth of the Nalón River.

Population
From: INE Archiv

Parishes
 La Arena 
 La Corrada 
 Ranón 
 Riberas 
 Soto

Gallery

References

External links
Official website

Municipalities in Asturias
Towns in Asturias